Pocatalico may refer to:

Pocatalico River, a river in West Virginia
Pocatalico, West Virginia, an unincorporated community